Hybolasius modestus is a species of beetle in the family Cerambycidae. It was described by Broun in 1880. It is known from New Zealand.

References

Hybolasius
Beetles described in 1880